Eomedina is a genus of bristle flies in the family Tachinidae.

Species
Eomedina apicalis (Curran, 1927)
Eomedina hamoyensis Cerretti & Wyatt, 2006

References

Exoristinae
Diptera of Africa
Tachinidae genera